Yayuan Liu (born 1992) is a Chinese-American materials scientist at Massachusetts Institute of Technology. Her research considers electrochemistry, nanomaterials and materials characterisation for the development of next-generation batteries. She was selected as one of the 2019 American Chemical Society Young Investigators and included in the 2021 Forbes 30 Under 30 list of top scientists.

Early life and education 
Liu is from China. She started her academic career in Nanyang Technological University, where she specialised in materials science and engineering. As an undergraduate student she worked with Fengwei Huo on metal–organic frameworks. During her undergraduate studies she spent a year at the University of Illinois at Urbana–Champaign, where she worked with Hong Yang on nanocrystals for electrocatalysis. After graduating from Nanyang Technological University in 2014 Liu returned to the United States, joining Yi Cui's laboratory to work on next-generation batteries. As a doctoral student at Stanford University, Liu developed a lithium fluoride coating technique that made use of Freon to passivate the lithium surfaces. By applying the coating to a graphene oxide electrodes, Liu managed to improve battery stability and Coulombic efficiency.

Research and career 
After earning her doctoral degree in 2019 Liu moved to Massachusetts Institute of Technology, where she works alongside T. Alan Hatton on stimuli responsive gas membranes. Broadly speaking, her work considers the design of new materials that allow high-capacity energy storage in electrochemistry applications. She has concentrated on lithium electrodes for next-generation batteries, which offer potential for high specific capacities and low electrochemical potentials. Unfortunately, these electrodes are highly reactive and change volume during cycling. Liu has worked to minimise the change in volume through scaffold compositions, control the reactivity of the electrodes through solid electrolyte interfaces and incorporated electrolyte additives to control the formation of interfaces.

Awards and honours 

 2014 Nanyang Technological University Lee Kuan Yew Gold Medal
 2019 American Chemical Society Division of Inorganic Chemistry Young Investigator Award
 2019 Massachusetts Institute of Technology Communication Fellow
 2019 Massachusetts Institute of Technology Rising Stars in Chemical Engineering
 2020 University of Washington Distinguished Young Scholars Seminar Winner 
 2021 Forbes 30 Under 30

Select publications

References

External links 
 

1992 births
Living people
Massachusetts Institute of Technology faculty
Nanyang Technological University alumni
Stanford University alumni
University of Illinois Urbana-Champaign alumni